Ahmed Fellat (born 1929) is a Moroccan gymnast. He competed in eight events at the 1960 Summer Olympics.

References

External links
 

1929 births
Possibly living people
Moroccan male artistic gymnasts
Olympic gymnasts of Morocco
Gymnasts at the 1960 Summer Olympics
Sportspeople from Rabat
20th-century Moroccan people